The North Sea Cup was an open chess tournament played in Esbjerg, Denmark from 1976 to 2008. Until 2003 there was an amateur section (a Swiss system tournament) and a 10-player round-robin tournament for titled players. The exceptions are 1986 and 1987. In 1986 the titled section was the play off for the Danish Chess Championship. In 1987 the titled section was replaced by the Danish Juniors' Championship. From 2004 the tournament has only one division, a nine- or ten-round Swiss system.

The North Sea Cup was not played in 2009.

Winners
{| class="wikitable"
! # !! Year !! Winner
|-
|	1	||	1976	||	 
|-
|	2	||	1977	||	
|-
|	3	||	1978	||	
|-
|	4	||	1979	||	 
|-
|	5	||	1980	||	
|-
|	6	||	1981	||	
|-
|	7	||	1982	||	
|-
|	8	||	1983	||	
|-
|	9	||	1984	||	
|-
|	10	||	1985	||	
|-
|	11	||	1986	||	 (match winner)
|-
|	12	||	1987	||	 (Danish Junior's Ch)
|-
|	13	||	1988	||	  
|-
|	14	||	1996	||	
|-
|	15	||	2000	||	  
|-
|	16	||	2001	||	  
|-
|	17	||	2002	||	  
|-
|	18	||	2003	||	    
|-
|	19	||	2004	||	
|-
|	20	||	2005	||	
|-
|	21	||	2006	||	    	  
|-
|	22	||	2007	||	
|-
|       23      ||      2008    ||      
|}

References
 Homepage of the North Sea Cup

External links
 Chessbase News (22 July 2003). "18th North Sea Cup – Esbjerge, Denmark. July 4-12.
 Weeks, Mark (17 August 2006). The Week in Chess 610, "21st North Sea Cup".
 North Sea Cup Esbjerg Denmark

1976 in chess
Recurring sporting events established in 1976
Chess competitions
Chess in Denmark
Sport in Esbjerg
1976 establishments in Denmark